Markus Farnleitner (born 12 October 1993) is an Austrian footballer who plays for FC Gleisdorf 09.

External links
 
 

Austrian footballers
Kapfenberger SV players
1993 births
Living people
Association football midfielders